The knockout stage was the second and final stage of the 2018 AFF Championship, following the group stage. It was played from 1 to 15 December with the top two teams from each group (two in total) advancing to the knockout stage to compete in a single-elimination tournament. Each tie was played on a home-and-away two-legged basis. The away goals rule, extra time and penalty shoot-out were used to decide the winner if necessary.

Vietnam won 3–2 on aggregate against Malaysia in the final to win their second title.

Qualified teams 
The top two placed teams from each of the two groups advanced to the knockout stage. In Group A, Vietnam secured the group top spots with 10 points after defeating Cambodia by 3–0 in their last match while Malaysia became the group runners-up with 9 points after beating Myanmar with similar scores of 3–0. Meanwhile in Group B, Thailand secured the group top spots with 10 points after defeating Singapore by 3–0 in their last match while Philippines became the group runners-up with 8 points after drawing 0–0 against Indonesia.

Schedule 
The schedule of each round was as follows.

Bracket 

Scores after extra time are indicated by (a.e.t.), and penalty shoot-out are indicated by (pen.).

Semi-finals 

|-

|-

|}

First leg

Malaysia vs Thailand

Philippines vs Vietnam

Second leg

Thailand vs Malaysia

Vietnam vs Philippines

Final 

|-

|}

First leg

Second leg

References

External links 
 AFF Suzuki Cup 2018 – Official website

Knockout stage